The Greater London League ran for seven seasons between 1964 and 1971.

1964–65

A Section
The A Section was composed of:   
Six clubs from the London League Premier Division (Barkingside, Epping Town, Hatfield Town, Hermes, London Transport and West Thurrock Athletic)
Three clubs from the Aetolian League (East Ham United, Eton Manor and Ford United)
Two clubs from the London League Division One (CAV Athletic and Canvey Island)
One club from the Essex and Suffolk Border League (Crittall Athletic)
Chingford

B Section
The B Section was composed of: 
Seven clubs from the Aetolian League (Beckenham Town, Cray Wanderers, Crockenhill, Faversham Town, Sheppey United, Snowdown Colliery Welfare and Whitstable Town)  
Four clubs from the London League Premier Division (ROFSA, Slade Green Athletic, Ulysses and Woolwich Polytechnic)
Tunbridge Wells Rangers

1965–66

Premier Division

Division One
Four new clubs joined Division One for the 1965–66 season:
Bexley
Highfield
Penhill Standard
Swanley

1966–67

Premier Division
Four new clubs joined the Premier Division for the 1966–67 season:
Barkingside (promoted from Division One)
Highfield (promoted from Division One)
Willesden (from the Spartan League)
Deal Town (from the Southern League)

Division One
Division One featured three new clubs for the 1966–67 season:
Beckenham Town (relegated from the Premier Division)
Battersea United 
RAS & RA

1967–68
The Premier Division was renamed Division One, and Division One renamed Division Two prior to the start of the 1967–68 season.

Division One
Division One featured three new clubs for the 1967–68 season:
Battersea United (promoted from old Division One)
Swanley (promoted from old Division One)
Woodford Town (from the Metropolitan League)

Division Two
Division Two featured three new clubs for the 1967–68 season:
Barkingside (relegated from the Premier Division)
Willesden (relegated from the Premier Division)
Brentsonians

1968–69

Division One
Division One featured two new clubs for the 1968–69 season:
Willesden (promoted from Division Two)
Chingford (promoted from Division Two)

Division Two
Division Two featured three new clubs for the 1968–69 season:
Woolwich Polytechnic (relegated from the Division One)
Northern Polytechnic
Heathside Sports

1969–70
The league featured one new club for the 1969–70 season:
Merton United

1970–71
Two new clubs joined the league for the 1970–71 season:
BROB Barnet
Vokins

A Section

B Section

References